Jeju International Airport  is the second largest airport in South Korea, just behind Incheon Airport in Incheon. It is located in the city of Jeju. The airport opened in 1968.

Jeju International Airport serves many mainland destinations in South Korea, as well as international destinations in China, Hong Kong, Japan, Taiwan, Thailand, Malaysia and Singapore. In 2015, 26,237,562 passengers used the airport. It is home to the world's busiest airline route, to Seoul-Gimpo.

Due to the large number of passengers using the airport and its limited capacity, it was announced in 2019 that a second airport would be constructed on the island near the southern city of Seogwipo with an investment of 3.8 billion US dollars. It is expected to open to the public in 2025.

Airlines and destinations

Traffic and statistics 
Due to the popularity of Jeju as a holiday spot in South Korea, the air route from Jeju to Seoul is the busiest airline route in the world. In 2019, there were 85 000 flights from eight different airlines, meanwhile, 17 million seats were deployed by flights between Gimpo and Jeju.

As Jeju has gained popularity as a resort destination, the number of international visitors from China, Malaysia, Thailand, and Japan has increased. In 1997, Jeju airport handled nine million passengers. In 2019, the airport passed the 30 million milestone despite being designed to handle a maximum of 26 million passengers. In 2020, the number of international visitors dropped due to COVID-19. However, the Seoul-Jeju route remained the busiest in the world and flight delays are still common.

In 2019, the Ministry of Land, Infrastructure, and Transport announced a $4.18 billion construction plan that would begin in 2021 in Seogwipo City in southern Jeju. The airport would take 50% of the domestic flights to Jeju and would help to transfer flights during bad weather. The airport would accommodate 18.98 million passengers by year.

Traffic by calendar year

Domestic traffic by route

Busiest international routes

Top carriers 

The percentage of passengers carried by the ten largest carriers in Jeju (covering arriving, departing and connecting passengers) in 2015 is as follows:

Accidents and incidents

 On 10 August 1994, Korean Air Flight 2033 overran the runway while attempting to land at Jeju International Airport. All 160 persons on board survived.
 On 28 July 2011, Asiana Airlines Flight 991 experienced an in-flight fire and crashed while attempting to divert to Jeju. Both pilots were killed.

See also
 Alddreu Airfield
 List of the busiest airports in South Korea
 List of airports in South Korea
 List of airports by ICAO code – South Korea
Transport in South Korea

References

External links 
 Official Site

Buildings and structures in Jeju Province
Airports in South Korea
Transport in Jeju Province
Airports established in 1968
1968 establishments in South Korea
20th-century architecture in South Korea